Ikigami: The Ultimate Limit is a Japanese manga series written and illustrated by Motoro Mase. The manga was serialized in Shogakukan's Weekly Young Sunday until the magazine ended on July 31, 2008. The serialization of the manga continued in Shogakukan's Big Comic Spirits from its 41st issue. Shogakukan released the manga's ten tankōbon volumes between August 5, 2005 and March 30, 2012. The manga is licensed in North America by Viz Media, which released the first tankōbon volume on May 12, 2009. The manga is also licensed in France by Asuka, in Spain and Italy by Panini Comics, in Taiwan by Sharp Point Press, in Korea by Haksan Culture Company, in Poland by Hanami, and Indonesia by Level Comics

The series has been collected into 10 tankōbon volumes, which have been republished in English.

Volume list

References

Ikigami: The Ultimate Limit